Verne Edwin Grant (1917-2007) was an American botanist and writer.

Grant was born in San Francisco, California. In 1940 he received his BA in Botany and in 1949 his PhD in Botany and Genetics from the University of California, Berkeley. He was the Professor of Botany for the University of Texas at Austin from 1970 to 1987.

His book The Origins of Adaptations (1963) discussed the main themes of the modern synthesis such as genetic drift, modes of speciation, natural selection  and population genetics. However, Grant did not describe these mechanisms of evolution as "Neo-Darwinism" or the synthetic theory, instead he referred to these mechanisms as the "causal theory." The book was awarded the 1964 Phi Beta Kappa Award in Science.

Systematic botanist Áskell Löve in a review for the book wrote that "Grant has succeeded in writing a text that is likely to affect the thinking in this field for decades to come and also to be regarded by students as one of the most informative texts on the subject ever written."

Publications

The Origins of Adaptations (1963)
The Architecture of the Germplasm (1964)
Plant Speciation (1971) 
Genetics of Flowering Plants (1975) 
Organismic Evolution (1977)
The Evolutionary Process: A Critical Review of Evolutionary Theory (1985)

References

American botanists
20th-century American non-fiction writers
American science writers
1917 births
2007 deaths
20th-century American male writers
American male non-fiction writers
University of California, Berkeley alumni
University of Texas at Austin faculty